Rivard is a surname of French origin meaning "of the river". 
Notable people with the surname include:

Antoine Rivard (1898–1985), French Canadian politician from Quebec
Augustin Rivard (1743–1798), Canadian farmer and political figure
Aurélie Rivard (born 1996), Canadian Paralympic swimmer
Bobby Rivard (born 1939), Canadian professional ice hockey player
Denise Poirier-Rivard (born 1941), Canadian politician from Quebec
Fern Rivard (born 1946), Canadian professional ice hockey player
Lucien Rivard (1914–2002), French criminal known for a sensational prison escape
Michel Rivard (born 1951), Québécois singer and songwriter
Rémy Girard (born 1950), Québécois actor and television host
Shantel Rivard, American professional women’s ice hockey player